"Teardrops" is a 1988 song by American husband/wife duo Womack & Womack, released as the first single from their fourth studio album, Conscience (1988). The song was written by Womack & Womack, while production was helmed by Chris Blackwell. Although the song was not a hit in their native United States, it charted highly in the United Kingdom and several European countries, as well as Australia and New Zealand.

In 1993, Elton John and k.d. lang covered "Teardrops" for John's album Duets. In 1998, UK garage group Lovestation covered the song, and later, German pop band No Angels and Australian singer Kate Alexa released their own cover versions as singles in 2007 and 2008, respectively. In 2002, Lulu and Elton John covered the song for Lulu's album Together. In 2009, the Sugababes re-recorded the track for the 50 Years of Island Records compilation. It has also been covered by The xx in 2009, on a bonus disc with their debut album xx, as well as by British singer Joss Stone who included the track on her 2012 album The Soul Sessions Vol. 2. In 2011, the song was covered by Cliff Richard and Candi Staton for Richard's Soulicious album and by Roosevelt in 2016.

Critical reception
Pan-European magazine Music & Media wrote, "You cannot resist this one: a sweet, supple and loosely arranged dance track featuring the wonderful vocals of Linda Womack." Jerry Smith from Music Week complimented "Teardrops" as a "stylish and svelte soul number that sees Chris Blackwell back in the producer's chair as its irresistible rhythm ensures success." Kevin Rowland from Record Mirror said, "Nice vocal effects and interplay. Heartfelt song, good groove."

Music video
In the accompanying music video for "Teardrops", the band members, studio musicians and backing vocalists are shown singing different parts of the song in a recording studio.

Track listings
All tracks writtten by Cecil Womack and Linda Womack, and produced by Chris Blackwell.

Charts

Weekly charts

Year-end charts

Certifications

Lovestation version

In 1998, British group Lovestation released a version of "Teardrops" as both a CD single and 12" vinyl record. "Teardrops" became the group's biggest hit, reaching number 14 in the United Kingdom. In 2000, the group released another version of the 1998 cover, but it did not achieve the same degree of success in the British charts, peaking at number 24. The 2000 release consisted of several remixes by producers such as Joey Negro, Eric Kupper and Jamie White.

Critical reception
Mixmag included "Teardrops" in their list of "40 of the best UK garage tracks released from 1995 to 2005". Capital Xtra included the song in their list of "The Best Old-School Garage Anthems of All Time". Gemtracks included the song in their list of the "top UK garage songs between 1995–2005".

Track listings
 CD maxi single
 "Teardrops" (Perky Park Radio) – 3:47
 "Teardrops" (Original 7" Mix) – 4:00
 "Teardrops" (Hip Hop Mix) – 6:30
 "Teardrops" (Perky Park Summer Experience Mix) – 6:15
 "Teardrops" (Serious Danger Mix) – 7:10

 UK CD single
 "Teardrops" (Flava Mix) - 3:46
 "Teardrops" (Lovestation Classic 12") - 6:33
 "Teardrops" (Wildcat Dub) - 8:22

 UK 12" single
A. "Teardrops" (Lovestation Classic 12")
B1. "Teardrops" (Flava Mix 12")
B2. "Teardrops" (Banana Republic Vocal Mix)

Charts

Weekly charts

Certifications

No Angels version

In June 2007, all-female German pop group No Angels recorded an uptempo version of "Teardrops". While the ballad "Amaze Me" was initially planned to be released as the third single from their fourth studio album, Destiny (2007), Universal Records persuaded the band to record additional material for a double A-single consisting of "Amaze Me" and "Teardrops." Production on the Womack & Womack cover was overseen by Swedish musicians Tobias Gustafsson, Vincent Pontare, and Michel Zitron. Built upon a synth-heavy, beat driven instrumentation, their version omits the opening verse's second line "I break down and cry, next time I'll be true, yeah."

Release and reception
"Teardrops"  was first previewed on RTL's news programme Punkt 6 on 22 August 2007, and by 27 August 2007, a thirty-seconds clip of the song had leaked onto the internet – the same week "Teardrops" was serviced to radio stations. No Angels premiered the song on the television live show ZDF Fernsehgarten on 9 September 2007. Physical and digital singles were released on 19 October 2007, including remixes by Roland Spremberg, Boogieman, and Mozart & Friends as well as the previoulsy unreleased track "Ain't Gonna Look the Other Way," a re-recording of the 2004 Tracy Ackerman-penned song by Canadian singer Celine Dion. On 2 November 2007, "Amaze Me"/"Teardrops" debuted and peaked at number 25 on the German Singles Chart, the band's second-lowest peak by then.

Music video
The music video for "Teardrops" was directed by Marcus Sternberg and shot in a filming studio between 20–22 August 2007 in Berlin, Germany. Shot over twenty hours back-to-back with the video for "Amaze Me", the edited clip premiered on 29 September 2007 on the Universal Music Group website. The clip received its first official airing in the week of 29 September 2007, on German music network iMusic1.

The group has declared the filming of the "mammoth shoot" as "extremely exhausting," referring to its extraordinary length and a delay of several hours, caused by various technical defects. Lucy Diakovska has described the plotless clip as a "funky disco-dance-energy-video," reflecting another facet of the band in music and style. Inspired by a concept developed by all four members and based on Sternberg's treatment, the music video was conceived as a stylistic counterpart to "Amaze Me".

Track listings

Notes
 denotes additional producer

Credits and personnel
Credits taken from Destiny Reloaded liner notes. 

Nadja Benaissa – lead vocalist
Lucy Diakovska – lead vocalist
Tobias Gustafsson – producer
Joachim "Jeo" Mezei – mixing engineer
Sandy Mölling – lead vocalist

Vincent Pontare – producer
Jessica Wahls – lead vocalist
Cecil Womack – writer
Linda Womack – writer
Michel Zitron – producer

Charts

Release history

Kate Alexa version

In early 2008, Australian singer Kate Alexa covered the song for her second studio album. It was produced by Molly Meldrum and features American rapper Baby Bash. It was released as the album's first single in Australia on 3 March 2008 as a CD single and digital download. Alexa has stated that she has always been a massive fan of the song, which was originally released the same year she was born. The song was released to Australian radio on 1 February 2008, and peaked at number sixty-four on the airplay chart.

The song's producer, Molly Meldrum, suggested that Alexa should cover the song. Alexa states "I was looking to do a single between albums, and Molly came up with the idea of doing "Teardrops". At first, I was a little sceptical because the original is such a classic and I love it so much. But then Molly and I spoke about how we could do it." American rapper, Baby Bash, heard what Alexa was doing with the song through a friend of Alexa's manager and decided to take part in the song. Alexa states "He's a very cool guy. He came in and did the rap in one take, and it fitted perfectly. It’s got such an incredible feel and groove and we wanted to keep that vibe. But we also wanted to do something different, and the rap takes the track to a whole new place."

The song debuted on the Australian ARIA Singles Chart in early March 2008 at number twenty-eight. It went to peak at number twenty-six the following week. It also charted at number seven on the Physical Singles chart and number eight on the Australian Artists Chart. "Teardrops" spent six weeks on the chart, five of which were in the top fifty. The music video for the song was filmed on 14 January 2008, at the Love Machine in South Yarra, Victoria, Australia.

Track listings

Charts

Sugababes version
On 1 June 2009, English girl group Sugababes' record label Island Records released the album Island Life – 50 Years of Island Records for which the Sugababes covered the track "Teardrops". The song debuted on the Romanian Top 100 at number 63 and charted 3 weeks later at number 40.

References

External links

1988 singles
1988 songs
1998 singles
2007 singles
2008 singles
Baby Bash songs
Dutch Top 40 number-one singles
Island Records singles
Jive Records singles
Kate Alexa songs
No Angels songs
Number-one singles in the Netherlands
Number-one singles in New Zealand
Polydor Records singles
Songs about loneliness
Songs written by Cecil Womack
Songs written by Linda Womack
Ultratop 50 Singles (Flanders) number-one singles
Universal Music Group singles
UK Independent Singles Chart number-one singles